The 2007 NCAA Division I softball season, play of college softball in the United States organized by the National Collegiate Athletic Association (NCAA) at the Division I level, began in February 2007.  The season progressed through the regular season, many conference tournaments and championship series, and concluded with the 2007 NCAA Division I softball tournament and 2007 Women's College World Series.  The Women's College World Series, consisting of the eight remaining teams in the NCAA Tournament and held in held in Oklahoma City at ASA Hall of Fame Stadium, ended on June 6, 2007.

Conference standings

Women's College World Series
The 2007 NCAA Women's College World Series took place from May 31 to June 6, 2007 in Oklahoma City.

Season leaders
Batting
Batting average: .492 – Kaitlin Cochran, Arizona State Sun Devils
RBIs: 81 – Samantha Ricketts, Oklahoma Sooners
Home runs: 25 – Beth Boden, Tennessee Tech Golden Eagles

Pitching
Wins: 50-5 – Monica Abbott, Tennessee Volunteers
ERA: 0.56 (25 ER/311.1 IP) – Angela Tincher Virginia Tech Hokies
Strikeouts: 724 – Monica Abbott, Tennessee Volunteers

Records
NCAA Division I season strikeouts:
724 – Monica Abbott, Tennessee Volunteers

Junior class strikeouts:
617 – Angela Tincher, Virginia Tech Hokies

Team strikeout ratio:
13.5 (910 SO/470.0 IP) – Tennessee Volunteers

Team fielding percentage:
.988% – Tennessee Volunteers

Awards
USA Softball Collegiate Player of the Year:
Monica Abbott, Tennessee Volunteers

Honda Sports Award Softball:
Monica Abbott, Tennessee Volunteers

Women's Sports Foundation Sportswoman of the Year Award Team:
Monica Abbott, Tennessee Lady Vols

Best Female College Athlete ESPY Award
Taryne Mowatt, Arizona Wildcats

All America Teams
The following players were members of the All-American Teams.

First Team

Second Team

Third Team

References

External links